Boris Xavier Alfaro Chong (born 29 October 1988) is a Panamanian international footballer who plays as a striker for Panamanian club Costa del Este.

Club career
Alfaro started his career at San Francisco and moved abroad to play in Bolivia with Universitario de Sucre and The Strongest as well as in Moldova for FC Sheriff Tiraspol. In summer 2014, he joined Venezuelan club Zamora and moved to Peruvian side USMP in January 2015.

He returned to San Francisco in summer 2015.

International career
Alfaro made his debut for Panama in a March 2009 friendly match against Trinidad and Tobago, his sole international to date.

Personal life
His maternal grandfather, whose last name is Chong, is Chinese.

Honors
Club
 ANAPROF (2):  2008 (A) 2009 (A)

References

External links
 
 

1988 births
Living people
Panamanian people of Chinese descent
Panamanian footballers
People from La Chorrera District
Association football forwards
San Francisco F.C. players
Universitario de Sucre footballers
FC Sheriff Tiraspol players
The Strongest players
Zamora FC players
Club Deportivo Universidad de San Martín de Porres players
Sporting San Miguelito players
Club San José players
Costa del Este F.C. players
Liga Panameña de Fútbol players
Bolivian Primera División players
Moldovan Super Liga players
Venezuelan Primera División players
Peruvian Primera División players
Panama international footballers
Panamanian expatriate footballers
Expatriate footballers in Bolivia
Panamanian expatriate sportspeople in Bolivia
Expatriate footballers in Moldova
Panamanian expatriate sportspeople in Moldova
Expatriate footballers in Venezuela
Panamanian expatriate sportspeople in Venezuela
Expatriate footballers in Peru
Panamanian expatriate sportspeople in Peru